List of women's doubles Grand Slam tennis tournament champions:

The only pairing to complete the Grand Slam is the team of Martina Navratilova and Pam Shriver in 1984, and their eight consecutive major win-streak remains the all-time record. Maria Bueno in 1960 and Martina Hingis in 1998 also won the Grand Slam, though with multiple partners.

Six players have completed a Career Golden Slam by winning an Olympic gold medal and all four majors during their respective careers: Venus Williams and Serena Williams while paired together, Barbora Krejčíková and Kateřina Siniaková as a team, and individually Pam Shriver and Gigi Fernández. The latter four also achieved the Career Super Slam, by achieving a Career Golden Slam and winning a Year-End Championship in their careers.

Champions by year

Champions list

Most Grand Slam doubles titles

Individual

Team

Grand Slam achievements

Grand Slam 
Players who held all four Grand Slam titles simultaneously (in a calendar year).

Non-calendar year Grand Slam 
Players who held all four Grand Slam titles simultaneously (not in a calendar year).

Career Grand Slam
Players who won all four Grand Slam titles over the course of their careers.
 The event at which the Career Grand Slam was completed indicated in bold.

Individual

Team

Career Golden Slam 
Players who won all four Grand Slam titles and the Olympic gold medal over the course of their careers.
 The event at which the Career Golden Slam was completed indicated in bold.

Career Super Slam 
Players who won all four Grand Slam titles, the Olympic gold medal and the year-end championship over the course of their careers.
 The event at which the Career Super Slam was completed indicated in bold.

Multiples titles in a season

Three titles

Two titles

Tournament stats

Most titles per tournament

Most consecutive titles

Overall record

At one tournament

Grand slam titles by decade 

1880s

1890s

1900s

1910s

1920s

1930s

1940s

1950s

1960s

1970s

1980s

1990s

2000s

2010s

2020s

Grand Slam titles by country 
Note: Titles, won by a team of players from same country, count as one title, not two.

All-time

Open era

See also

 List of Grand Slam–related tennis records
 List of Grand Slam men's singles champions
 List of Grand Slam women's singles champions
 List of Grand Slam men's doubles champions
 List of Grand Slam mixed doubles champions

References

women's doubles
 
Grand Slam